Church and Oswaldtwistle Cricket Club, based at Oswaldtwistle, Accrington, is a cricket club in the Lancashire League. They play at the West End Ground on Blackburn Road in Oswaldtwistle. Their captain for the 2011 season is Craig Fergusson and their professional was Pakistani Saeed Anwar.

The club was founded in 1856. It moved to its present location in 1890 and joined the Lancashire League at its inception in 1892. The club has won the League on five occasions, most recently in 1963. During this period it has fielded notable cricketers such as Sydney Barnes, Cecil Parkin, and Chester Watson.

Honours
1st XI League Winners - 5 - 1939, 1940, 1941, 1945, 1962
Worsley Cup Winners - 1 - 1974
20/20 Cup Winners - 2 - 2014, 2016
2nd XI League Winners - 6 - 1898, 1926, 1930, 1938, 1991, 2010
2nd XI (Lancashire Telegraph) Cup Winners - 2 - 1999, 2010
3rd XI League Winners - 1 - 1984
Highest 50 overs score - 306-4 v East Lancs, 1 August 2004

References

External links
Official website
Church CC at lancashireleague.com

Lancashire League cricket clubs
Sport in Hyndburn
Accrington
1856 establishments in England